Timeline of the COVID-19 pandemic in Indonesia may refer to:

 Timeline of the COVID-19 pandemic in Indonesia (2020)
 Timeline of the COVID-19 pandemic in Indonesia (2021)
 Timeline of the COVID-19 pandemic in Indonesia (2022)

Indonesia